12 Ophiuchi is a variable star in the constellation Ophiuchus.  No companions have yet been detected in orbit around this star, and it remains uncertain whether or not it possesses a dust ring.

This star is categorized as a BY Draconis variable, with variable star designation V2133. The variability is attributed to large-scale magnetic activity on the chromosphere (in the form of starspots) combined with a rotational period that moved the active regions into (and out of) the line of sight.  This results in low amplitude variability of 12 Ophiuchi's luminosity.  The star also appears to display rapid variation in luminosity, possibly due to changes in the starspots. Measurements of the long-term variability show two overlapping cycles of starspot activity (compared to the Sun's single, 11-year cycle.)  The periods of these two cycles are 4.0 and 17.4 years.

This star is among the top 100 target stars for NASA's planned Terrestrial Planet Finder mission . However, the mission is now postponed indefinitely.

Its abundance of heavy elements (elements heavier than helium) is nearly identical to that of the Sun. The space velocity is 30 km/s relative to the solar system. The high rotation period and active chromosphere are indicative of a relatively young star.

References

External links 
 

Ophiuchus (constellation)
BY Draconis variables
K-type main-sequence stars
Ophiuchi, 12
Ophiuchi, 12
149661
081300
6171
0631
Ophiuchi, V2133
Durchmusterung objects